The following outline is provided as an overview of and topical guide to The Bahamas:

Commonwealth of The Bahamas – sovereign island country comprising an archipelago of seven hundred islands and two thousand cays.  The Bahamas are located in the Atlantic Ocean, southeast of Florida and the United States, north of Cuba, the island of Hispaniola and the Caribbean, and northwest of the British Overseas Territory of the Turks and Caicos Islands.

General reference

 Pronunciation:
 Common English country names: The Bahamas or the Bahama Islands
 Official English country name: The Commonwealth of The Bahamas
 Common endonym(s):  
 Official endonym(s):  
 Adjectival(s): Bahamian
 Demonym(s):
 ISO country codes: BS, BHS, 044
 ISO region codes: See ISO 3166-2:BS
 Internet country code top-level domain: .bs

Geography of the Bahamas 

 The Bahamas is...
 an archipelago
 a country
 an island country consisting of two thousand cays and seven hundred islands
 a nation state
 a Commonwealth realm
 Location:
 Northern Hemisphere and Western Hemisphere
 North America (off the East Coast of the United States, southeast of Florida)
 Atlantic Ocean
 North Atlantic Ocean
 Time zone:  Eastern Standard Time (UTC−05), Eastern Daylight Time (UTC−04)
 Extreme points of the Bahamas
 High:  Mount Alvernia on Cat Island 
 Low:  North Atlantic Ocean 0 m
 Land boundaries:  none
 Coastline:  North Atlantic Ocean 3,542 km
 Population of the Bahamas: 330,549 (2007) – 177th most populous country
 Area of the Bahamas:  – 160th largest country
 Maps of the Bahamas
 Atlas of the Bahamas

Environment of the Bahamas 

 Climate of the Bahamas
 Renewable energy in the Bahamas
 Geology of the Bahamas
 Protected areas of the Bahamas
 Biosphere reserves in the Bahamas
 National parks of the Bahamas
 Wildlife of the Bahamas
 Fauna of the Bahamas
 Birds of the Bahamas
 Mammals of the Bahamas

Natural geographic features of the Bahamas 
 Rivers of the Bahamas
 World Heritage Sites in the Bahamas: None

Islands of the Bahamas

List of Islands in the Bahamas

 Abaco
 Acklins
 Acklins and Crooked Islands
 Andros, Bahamas
 Berry Islands
 Bimini
 Castaway Cay
 Cat Island (Bahamas)
 Conception Island
 Crooked Island (Bahamas)
 Egg Island (Bahamas)
 Eleuthera
 Exuma
 Grand Bahama
 Great Guana Cay
 Little San Salvador Island
 Little Stirrup Cay
 Long Island, Bahamas
 Man-O-War Cay
 Mayaguana
 Moore's Island
 New Providence
 Norman's Cay
 Out Islands
 Paradise Island
 Ragged Island
 Rum Cay
 Samana Cay
 San Salvador Island
 Windermere Island

Regions of the Bahamas 
New Providence
Regions of the Bahamas

Ecoregions of the Bahamas 

List of ecoregions in the Bahamas
 Ecoregions in the Bahamas

Administrative divisions of the Bahamas 

Administrative divisions of the Bahamas
 Districts of the Bahamas
 Municipalities of the Bahamas

Districts of the Bahamas 

Districts of the Bahamas
Acklins
Berry Islands
Bimini
Black Point (Exuma)
Cat Island
Central Abaco
Central Andros
Central Eleuthera
City of Freeport (Grand Bahama)
Crooked Island
East Grand Bahama
Exuma
Grand Cay (Abaco)
Harbour Island (Eleuthera)
Hope Town (Abaco)
Inagua
Long Island
Mangrove Cay (Andros)
Mayaguana
Moore's Island (Abaco)
New Providence
North Abaco
North Andros
North Eleuthera
Ragged Island
Rum Cay
San Salvador
South Abaco
South Andros
South Eleuthera
Spanish Wells (Eleuthera)
West Grand Bahama

Municipalities of the Bahamas
Cities: List of cities in the Bahamas
Capital: Nassau

Demography of the Bahamas 

Demographics of the Bahamas

Government and politics of the Bahamas 

 Form of government: parliamentary representative democratic monarchy
 Capital of the Bahamas: Nassau
 Elections in the Bahamas
 Political parties in the Bahamas

Branches of the government of the Bahamas 

Government of the Bahamas

Executive branch of the government of the Bahamas 
 Head of state: Monarchy of the Bahamas
 Head of government: Prime Minister of the Bahamas
 Philip Davis (Bahamian politician)
 Perry Christie
 Hubert Ingraham
 Sir Lynden Oscar Pindling
 Roland Theodore Symonette
 Cabinet of the Bahamas

Legislative branch of the government of the Bahamas 

 Parliament of the Bahamas (bicameral)
 Upper house: Senate of the Bahamas
 Lower house: House of Assembly of the Bahamas

Judicial branch of the government of the Bahamas 

Court system of the Bahamas
 Supreme Court of the Bahamas

Foreign relations of the Bahamas 

Foreign relations of the Bahamas
 Diplomatic missions in the Bahamas
 Diplomatic missions of the Bahamas
 United States-the Bahamas relations

International organization membership 
The Commonwealth of the Bahamas is a member of:

African, Caribbean, and Pacific Group of States (ACP)
Agency for the Prohibition of Nuclear Weapons in Latin America and the Caribbean (OPANAL)
Caribbean Community and Common Market (Caricom)
Caribbean Development Bank (CDB)
Commonwealth of Nations
Food and Agriculture Organization (FAO)
Group of 77 (G77)
Inter-American Development Bank (IADB)
International Bank for Reconstruction and Development (IBRD)
International Civil Aviation Organization (ICAO)
International Confederation of Free Trade Unions (ICFTU)
International Criminal Court (ICCt) (signatory)
International Criminal Police Organization (Interpol)
International Development Association (IDA)
International Federation of Red Cross and Red Crescent Societies (IFRCS)
International Finance Corporation (IFC)
International Fund for Agricultural Development (IFAD)
International Labour Organization (ILO)
International Maritime Organization (IMO)
International Mobile Satellite Organization (IMSO)
International Monetary Fund (IMF)
International Olympic Committee (IOC)

International Organization for Migration (IOM)
International Red Cross and Red Crescent Movement (ICRM)
International Telecommunication Union (ITU)
International Telecommunications Satellite Organization (ITSO)
Latin American Economic System (LAES)
Multilateral Investment Guarantee Agency (MIGA)
Nonaligned Movement (NAM)
Organisation for the Prohibition of Chemical Weapons (OPCW) (signatory)
Organization of American States (OAS)
United Nations (UN)
United Nations Conference on Trade and Development (UNCTAD)
United Nations Educational, Scientific, and Cultural Organization (UNESCO)
United Nations Industrial Development Organization (UNIDO)
Universal Postal Union (UPU)
World Customs Organization (WCO)
World Federation of Trade Unions (WFTU)
World Health Organization (WHO)
World Intellectual Property Organization (WIPO)
World Meteorological Organization (WMO)
World Tourism Organization (UNWTO)
World Trade Organization (WTO) (observer)

Law and order in the Bahamas 

Law of the Bahamas
 Constitution of the Bahamas
 Crime in the Bahamas
 Human rights in the Bahamas
 LGBT rights in the Bahamas
 Freedom of religion in the Bahamas
 Law enforcement in the Bahamas

Military of the Bahamas 

Military of the Bahamas
 Command
 Commander-in-chief
 Ministry of National Security of the Bahamas
 Forces
 Army of the Bahamas
 Navy of the Bahamas
 Air Force of the Bahamas
 Special forces of the Bahamas
 Military history of the Bahamas
 Military ranks of the Bahamas

Local government in the Bahamas 

Local government in the Bahamas

History of the Bahamas 

History of the Bahamas
 Battle of Nassau
 Colonial Heads of the Bahamas
 Fresh Creek
 Guanahani
 Kemps Bay
 Nichollstown and Berry Islands
 Postage stamps and postal history of the Bahamas
 San Salvador and Rum Cay

Hurricanes in the Bahamas
 Nassau Hurricane of 1926
 1926 Miami Hurricane
 1928 Okeechobee Hurricane
 1929 Florida Hurricane
 1947 Fort Lauderdale Hurricane
 Hurricane Andrew
 Bahamas-Nantucket Hurricane of 1932
 Hurricane Betsy (1956)
 Hurricane Betsy
 Hurricane David
 Hurricane Gracie
 Hurricane Hortense
 Hurricane Inez
 Hurricane Lili (1996)
 Hurricane Floyd
 Hurricane Irene (2011)
 Hurricane Sandy (2012)
 Hurricane Dorian (2019)

Culture of the Bahamas 

Culture of the Bahamas
 Architecture of the Bahamas
 Lighthouses in The Bahamas
 Cuisine of the Bahamas
 Festivals in the Bahamas
 Gambling in the Bahamas
 Casinos in the Bahamas
 Atlantis Paradise Island
 Baha Mar
 Languages of the Bahamas
 Media in the Bahamas
List of newspapers in the Bahamas
 National symbols of the Bahamas
 Coat of arms of the Bahamas
 Flag of the Bahamas
 National anthem of the Bahamas: March On, Bahamaland
 People of the Bahamas
 Public holidays in the Bahamas
 Records of the Bahamas
 Religion in the Bahamas
 Christianity in the Bahamas
 Catholicism in the Bahamas
 Roman Catholic Archdiocese of Nassau
 Hinduism in the Bahamas
 Islam in the Bahamas
 Judaism in the Bahamas
 Sikhism in the Bahamas
 Scouting in the Bahamas
 The Scout Association of the Bahamas
 World Heritage Sites in the Bahamas: None

Art in the Bahamas 
 Art in the Bahamas
 Cinema of the Bahamas
 Literature of the Bahamas
 Music of the Bahamas
 Baha Men
 Eric Gibson
 Junkanoo
 Music of The Bahamas (docu-musical)
 Ripsaw music
 Television in the Bahamas
 Theatre in the Bahamas

People of the Bahamas 
 Milo Butler
 R.E. Cooper, Sr. (Baptist Clergy and Civil Rights Activist)
 Clifford Darling
 Arthur Hailey
 Arthur Dion Hanna
 Viktor Kožený
 Joe Lewis (British businessman)
 Sidney Poitier
 Orville Alton Turnquest

Sport in the Bahamas

Sports in the Bahamas
 Bahamas at the 2006 Commonwealth Games

Bahamas at the Commonwealth Games
 Bahamas at the 1958 British Empire and Commonwealth Games
 Bahamas at the 2002 Commonwealth Games
 Bahamas at the 2006 Commonwealth Games

Football in the Bahamas
 Football in the Bahamas
 Bahamas Football Association
 Bahamas national football team
 Gary White (footballer)

Bahamian football clubs
 Bahamas Shrimp Wranglers
 Freeport F.C.
 Freeport Jet Wash Jets
 Playtime Tigers
 Quality Superstars
 Town & Country Predators

Bahamian football competitions
 Grand Bahama Football League
 New Providence Football League

Football venues in the Bahamas
 Grand Bahama Stadium
 Thomas Robinson Stadium

Bahamas at the Olympics
 The Bahamas at the Olympics
 Bahamas at the 1956 Summer Olympics
 Bahamas at the 1964 Summer Olympics
 Bahamas at the 1988 Summer Olympics
 Bahamas at the 1992 Summer Olympics
 Bahamas at the 1996 Summer Olympics
 Bahamas at the 2000 Summer Olympics
 Bahamas at the 2004 Summer Olympics

Economy and infrastructure of the Bahamas 

Economy of the Bahamas
 Economic rank, by nominal GDP (2007): 132nd (one hundred and thirty second)
 Agriculture in the Bahamas
 Banking in the Bahamas
Banknotes of the Bank of Nassau (Bahamas)
 Central Bank of The Bahamas
 National Bank of the Bahamas
 Communications in the Bahamas
 Internet in the Bahamas
.bs Internet country code top-level domain for the Bahamas
 Telephone communications in the Bahamas
 Area code 242
 Postal service in the Bahamas
 Postage stamps and postal history of the Bahamas
 List of people on stamps of the Bahamas
 Television in the Bahamas
 List of television stations in the Bahamas by call sign
 Companies of the Bahamas
 BaTelCo (Bahamas)
 Bahamas Electricity Corporation
 Bahamasair
 Bahama Hand Prints
Currency of the Bahamas: Dollar
 Bahamian pound (historical)
ISO 4217: BSD
 Energy in the Bahamas
 Energy policy of the Bahamas
 Oil industry in the Bahamas
 Health care in the Bahamas
 Mining in the Bahamas
 Bahamas Stock Exchange
 Trade unions of the Bahamas
 Bahamas Hotel, Catering and Allied Workers Union
 Bahamas Taxi Cab Union
 Commonwealth of the Bahamas Trade Union Congress
 National Congress of Trade Unions
 Tourism in the Bahamas
 Visa policy of Bahamas
 Transport in the Bahamas
 Air transport in the Bahamas
 Airlines of the Bahamas
 Bahamasair
 Western Air
 Sky Bahamas
 Pineapple Air
 Southern Air Charter
 LeAir
 Cat Island Air
 Airports in the Bahamas
 Exuma International Airport
 Grand Bahama International Airport
 Lynden Pindling International Airport
 San Salvador Airport
 Rail transport in the Bahamas
 Roads in the Bahamas
 Water supply and sanitation in the Bahamas

Education in the Bahamas 

Education in the Bahamas
 College of the Bahamas
 University of the Bahamas

Specific Bahamian people

List of Bahamians
 Milo Butler
 R.E. Cooper, Sr. (Baptist Clergy and Civil Rights Activist)
 Clifford Darling
 Arthur Hailey
 Arthur Dion Hanna
 Viktor Kožený
 Joe Lewis (British businessman)
 Sidney Poitier
 Orville Alton Turnquest

Bahamian musicians
 List of Bahamian musicians
 Sebastian Bach
 Baha Men
 Eric Gibson
 Joseph Spence

Bahamian politicians
 Ivy Dumont
 Earl Hall
 List of Governors-General of the Bahamas
 Stafford Sands
 Robert Sweeting
 Brent Symonette

Bahamian sportspeople

Bahamian athletes (track and field)
 Christine Amertil
 Chris Brown
 Eldece Clarke-Lewis
 Aaron Cleare
 Dennis Darling
 Pauline Davis-Thompson
 Dominic Demeritte
 Laverne Eve
 Debbie Ferguson
 Savatheda Fynes
 Craig Hepburn
 Troy Kemp
 Troy McIntosh
 Nathaniel McKinney
 Avard Moncur
 Frank Rutherford
 Leevan Sands
 Chandra Sturrup
 Andrae Williams
 Tonique Williams-Darling

Bahamian basketball players
 Deandre Ayton
 Rick Fox
 Trevor Harvey
 Buddy Hield
 Mychal Thompson

Bahamian American football players
 Devard Darling
 Alex Smith, son of Ed Smith
 Ed Smith, first Bahamian to play in the NFL

Olympic competitors for the Bahamas
 Chris Brown
 Dominic Demeritte
 Craig Hepburn
 Troy Kemp
 Troy McIntosh
 Avard Moncur
 Frank Rutherford

Bahamian tennis players
 Mark Knowles
 Roger Smith (tennis player)

See also

 Bibliography of the Bahamas
Index of Bahamas-related articles

List of international rankings
Member state of the Commonwealth of Nations
Member state of the United Nations
Outline of geography
Outline of North America

References

External links

 
 The Official Tourism Website of The Islands Of The Bahamas
 Official website for Bahamas government
 
 Bahamas Financial Services Board
 The Association of International Banks & Trust Companies in The Bahamas
 The Bahamas Constitution
 Bahamas. The World Factbook. Central Intelligence Agency.

Bahamas
 1